Ali Kerboua (born April 17, 1983 in Blida, Algeria) is an Algerian volleyball player. He is a member of the Algeria men's national volleyball team.

Club information
Current club:  Nasr Volleyball
Debut club:  USM Blida

References

1983 births
Living people
People from Blida
Algerian men's volleyball players
Algerian expatriate sportspeople in the United Arab Emirates
Competitors at the 2013 Mediterranean Games
Mediterranean Games competitors for Algeria
21st-century Algerian people
Competitors at the 2022 Mediterranean Games
20th-century Algerian people